Crataegus intricata is a species of hawthorn known by the common names Copenhagen hawthorn, Lange's thorn and thicket hawthorn. It is native to eastern Canada and the eastern United States. Its fruit are brown to red.

References

intricata
Trees of the Southeastern United States
Flora of North America